Fatih Altaylı (born 20 September 1962) is a Turkish journalist, columnist, television presenter and media executive.

Life
He graduated from Galatasaray High School in Istanbul. Fatih Altaylı stepped into journalism at the newspaper Cumhuriyet as a sports reporter. In 1993, he co-founded the radio station Best FM. From 1995 on, Altaylı continued with broadcasting at Show Radio for about one year. The same year, he was appointed news presenter at the sister media Show TV channel. In addition, he started to present. his own program Teke Tek (One to One).

In 1996, Altaylı transferred to Doğan Media Group. While writing his column at Hürriyet, he was tasked with the post of a coordinator at Radio D in the same media group. In the summer of 2002, Fatih Altaylı was appointed top executive of the television channel Kanal D.

Later, he worked as the top executive of the newspaper Sabah. He resigned from this post as the newspaper was 
sold to Çalık Holding's Turkuaz Media in 2008 after it was seized in April 2007 by the governmental Savings Deposit Insurance Fund of Turkey (TMSF) due to financial problems of the former owner Dinç Bilgin.

Altaylı worked a while as a freelancer writing at his own website. Before he was appointed in January 2009 the top executive of the newly established newspaper Habertürk, he served as a news presenter at the television channel Kanal 1. In addition to his duty at the newspaper, he presents his program Teke Tek at the sister media Habertürk TV.

Altaylı served also as the vice president of Galatasaray S.K.

Fatih Altaylı is married to Hande Altaylı. The couple has a daughter.

Historically, he was known as an activist for the enlightenment of the society, he was the initiator of the campaigns Haydi Kızlar Okula (Let's Go To School Girls), Sürekli Aydınlık için Bir Dakika Karanlık (One Minute Blackout For Continuous Enlightenment) and Temiz İnternet (Clean Internet). He was awarded the honor prize of the Turkish Businesswomen Association and the Association of European Journalists for his contribution to education.

Controversies
Following the 2013 corruption scandal in Turkey, Altaylı was heavily criticized for manipulating the election polls to favor the PM Recep Tayyip Erdoğan's party, and for publishing an article at the request of PM Erdoğan, which led to firing of an editor and two journalists from Habertürk.

There is controversy over his ownership of the Varagavank Monastery, which he inherited from his grandfather. When interviewed by Agos, He publicly said that he would return the monastery to the tourism board or Patriarchate so it could be renovated, but this has not been done. He claims that nobody in the government would respond to his requests, but at the same time did not even attempt to make an effort to give the deed to the Armenian Patriarchate. The only time he himself attempted to return it was right after a change of government in Van occurred,(the prior government were the ones who suggested the idea to restore it) resulting in the new government he asked having no interest in the restorations.

In his television program with Corona as the main subject, he made an unprompted statement where he accused Syrian refugees of "Holding Turkey as hostage" and "Acting as a proxy for the Syrian government such that they have already won (against Turkey)", among other accusations such as "being exempt from law".

Media 

Newspapers
 Cumhuriyet (1982–1987)
 Güneş (1987–1992)
 Hürriyet (1995–2005)
 Sabah (2005–2007)
 Habertürk (2009–present)

Radio stations
 Best FM (1993–1995)
 Show Radio (1995–1996)
 Radyo D (1996–2002)

Television channels
 Show TV (1995–1996)
 Kanal D (1996–2005)
 atv (2005–2007)
 Kanal 1 (2007–2008)
 Habertürk TV (2008–present)

References

External links 
 Fatih Altaylı'nın Köşe Yazıları 
 Fatih Altaylı'nın Eşcinsel Haklarıyla İlgili Kaos GL Röportajı
 Fatih Altaylı'nın İş ve Kariyer Üzerine Yaptığı Röportaj

1962 births
People from Van, Turkey
Galatasaray High School alumni
Turkish journalists
Turkish columnists
Turkish radio presenters
Turkish broadcast news analysts
Cumhuriyet people
Radio company founders
Turkish radio journalists
Radio executives
Television executives
Newspaper executives
Hürriyet people
Güneş (newspaper) people
Sabah (newspaper) people
Habertürk people
Galatasaray S.K. board members
Living people
Turkish television talk show hosts